The Eye of Providence (or the All-Seeing Eye of God) is a figure that depicts an eye, often enclosed in a triangle and surrounded by rays of light or glory, meant to represent divine providence whereby the eye of God watches over humanity. The Eye of Providence is a widely recognized symbol, giving it instrumentality in the fields of iconography and semiotics. A well known example of the Eye of Providence appears on the reverse of the Great Seal of the United States, which is depicted on the United States one-dollar bill.

Use by governments and confederations

United States 
In 1782, the Eye of Providence was adopted as part of the symbolism featured on the reverse side of the Great Seal of the United States. It was first proposed as an element of the Great Seal by the first of three design committees in 1776, and is thought to be the suggestion of the artistic consultant, Pierre Eugene du Simitiere, and at the time, was a conventional symbol for God’s benevolent oversight.

In his original proposal to the committee, du Simitiere placed the Eye over shields so as to symbolize each of the original thirteen states of the Union. On the version of the seal that would eventually be approved, the Eye is positioned above an unfinished pyramid of thirteen steps (again symbolizing the original States, but also incorporating the nation's potential for future growth). Such symbolism is explained through the motto that appears above the Eye, annuit cœptis, meaning "He approves [our] undertakings" (or "has approved").

Perhaps due to its use in the design of the Great Seal, the Eye has made its way into other American seals and logos, such as, for example:

The Seal of Colorado
 The city seal of Kenosha, Wisconsin
DARPA's Information Awareness Office

U.S. currency 
The Eye of Providence has been used among various forms of currency throughout U.S. history, including:

the United States one-dollar bill, as part of the Great Seal
 the Vermont Copper
Nova Constellatio patterns of 1783
 Nova Constellatio coppers of 1783 and 1785
 some Immune Columbia issues

Lithuania 
The Eye of Providence appears on several Lithuanian coats of arms, including those of:

 Alovė
 Baisogala
 Kalvarija
 Plungė (and its flag)
 Šiauliai (and its flag)

Other countries 
The Eye of Providence appears on the Coat of Arms of Brasłaŭ, Belarus, Neman, Russia and of Wilamowice, Poland. The Eye was also part of the flag and coat of arms adopted by the Confederation of the Equator, a short lived 1824 secessionist revolt in the Northeastern provinces of Brazil. In the United Kingdom, the symbol was part of the Guards Division insignia, created in 1915.

In Estonia, the 50 krooni note shows the Eye as part of a depiction of the pipe organ of the Käina church. Likewise, the (old) 500 Ukrainian hryvnia note also depicts the Eye.

The Eye was included in the original publication of France's Declaration of the Rights of Man and of the Citizen, which also borrows iconography from the Ten Commandments. Similarly, the symbol is featured on the front page of the Constitution of Serbia from 1835.
In Nigeria, the eye symbol is part of Nigeria Customs Service logo.

Freemasonry 

Today, the Eye of Providence is often associated with Freemasonry, first appearing as part of the standard Freemason iconography in 1797 with the publication of Thomas Smith Webb's The Freemason's Monitor. 

In this use, the Eye, representing the all-seeing eye of God, serves as a reminder that humanity's thoughts and deeds are always observed by God—who is referred to in Masonry as the Great Architect of the Universe. Typically, the Masonic Eye of Providence has a semicircular glory below it, and is sometimes enclosed by a triangle.

Popular among conspiracy theorists is the claim that the Eye of Providence shown atop an unfinished pyramid on the Great Seal of the United States indicates the influence of Freemasonry in the founding of the United States. However, common Masonic use of the Eye dates to 14 years after the creation of the Great Seal. Furthermore, the only Mason among the members of the various design committees for the Great Seal was Benjamin Franklin, whose ideas for the seal were not adopted. Likewise, various Masonic organizations have explicitly denied any connection to the creation of the Seal.

Use in religion

Christianity 

The association of an eye with the concept of Divine Providence is found in Christianity. In late Renaissance European iconography, the Eye, surrounded by a triangle, was an explicit symbol of the Christian Holy Trinity. The Eye of Providence was later painted above an image of three faces in Pontormo's 1525 Supper at Emmaus. Seventeenth-century depictions of the Eye sometimes show it surrounded by clouds or sunbursts. The Eye of God in a triangle is still used in church architecture and Christian art to symbolize the Trinity and God's omnipresence and divine providence. 

The Eye of Providence is notably featured on the following Eastern Orthodox, Latter-day Saint, and Catholic buildings, among others:

The Kazan Cathedral, Saint Petersburg, Russia
The Salt Lake Temple, Salt Lake City, Utah
Jesuit Church, Mannheim, Germany
Shio-Mgvime Monastery, Mtskheta, Georgia

Miscellaneous uses 
Commonly in the context of a reference to the Illuminati, numerous video games, TV shows, films, books, and websites contain depictions of the Eye.

University/college insignia and logos of organisations 
Several universities and college fraternities use the Eye of Providence in their coats of arms, seals, or badges, notably: 

 Delta Tau Delta, based in Bethany, West Virginia
 Phi Kappa Psi, based in Canonsburg, Pennsylvania 
 Phi Delta Theta, based in Oxford, Ohio. 
 Delta Kappa Epsilon, based in Ann Arbor, Michigan
 The University of Chile, Santiago, Chile
 The University of Mississippi, Oxford, Mississippi.

Gallery

See also 
 
 Eye of Horus
 Eye of Ra
 Pyramidion
 Third eye

References

External links 
 

Christian symbols
Conceptions of God
Conspiracy theories
Heraldic charges
Masonic symbolism
Pictograms
Eyes in culture
Triangles